Duan Dechang (August 19, 1904 – May 1, 1933) was a member of the Chinese Workers' and Peasants' Red Army. He was born in Nan County, Yiyang, Hunan Province. He joined the Communist Youth League of China in June 1925 and the Communist Party of China in September 1925. He participated in the Northern Expedition. Around this time, he met Peng Dehuai. In August 1927, after the beginning of the Chinese Civil War between the communists and the Kuomintang, Duan participated in the Nanchang Uprising. After its defeat, he went to Gong'an County in Jingzhou, Hubei Province. In November 1931, he traveled from the Honghu Soviet in Hubei in Ruijin in the Jiangxi Soviet for a conference to coordinate the various Soviets. During the purges carried out by Xia Xi, Duan was one of those who died. He was killed in Badong County, Hubei. After requesting the executioners not to use bullets, he was put to death by the sword.

Legacy
On 10 September 2009, Duan was voted to be one of the 100 heroes who made significant contribution to the establishment of the People's Republic of China. Xu Jishen, another Red Army commander who was killed in the purges carried out by Zhang Guotao and Xia Xi, was also honored as part of the group.

References 

 共和国一号烈士段德昌：半生浮沉 一世功名(组图). 搜狐. 2014-09-17 [2015-10-06]
 王永均. 黄埔军校三百名将传. 广西人民出版社. 1989年: 566. .
 《彭德怀传》编写组. 彭德怀传. 当代中国出版社. 2006-12: 22–23. 
 范济国 主编 (Ed.). 中国革命史人物传略. 武汉: 湖北教育出版社. 1987: 128. 
 段德昌曾领导公安县年关暴动. 长江商报. 2011-05-03 [2015-10-09]
 52年毛泽东签发"烈士证"排在第一号的是谁？. 人民网. 2015-06-16 [2015-10-09]
 段德昌. 光明网. 2011-05-03 [2015-10-09]
 散木. 夏曦湘鄂西苏区肃反杀害千余名高级将领. 腾讯. 2011-03-07 [2015-10-09]
 被自己人砍头的共和国第一烈士段德昌. 搜狐. 2014-11-26 [2015-10-09]

1904 births
1933 deaths
Chinese communists
People from Nan County
Chinese Red Army generals
Executed people from Hunan
Executed Republic of China people
Generals from Hunan